On the afternoon of June 23, 2016, a severe thunderstorm produced a large, violent tornado over Jiangsu province, China. Striking areas northeast of Yancheng around 2:30 p.m. local time, the tornado killed 98 people and injured 846 others (152 critically). The China Meteorological Administration later ranked the tornado as an EF4 on the Enhanced Fujita scale. Another tornado spawned by the same supercell killed one person in the Sheyang area.

Background
During the late spring and early summer, a semi-permanent frontal boundary—called the meiyu front—emerges across eastern China, Taiwan, and Japan. This feature leads to prolonged periods of heavy rain and thunderstorms which frequently cause damage. Rainfall along this boundary tends to be particularly heavy in post-El Niño summers, such as the summer of 2016. One particular storm complex over Jiangsu Province spanned  and produced a tornado near Yancheng around 2:30 p.m. local time (0630 UTC). The tornado was accompanied by a hailstorm.

Impact

The enormous, violent wedge-shaped tornado carved a wide path of destruction through the Funing area of Yancheng in Jiangsu province, at one point reaching a peak width of 4.1 km wide (2.5 miles). The tornado first touched down in the village of Banhuzen, and then left behind catastrophic damage as it impacted areas in and around the villages of Laowangcun, Jiqiaocun, Dalaocun, Xuejiagang, Beichencun, and Lixingqiao, all located west of or along the southern fringes of downtown Funing. East of Funing, the tornado caused damage in the village of Wutanzhen before dissipating. Thousands of well-built masonry-construction homes were heavily damaged or destroyed along the path, with many completely leveled. Manufacturing plants, businesses, and rice mills suffered from similar destruction, and multiple large factory buildings were severely damaged at a Canadian Solar plant. Two large school buildings were heavily damaged as well, and multiple large, multi-ton metal shipping containers were lofted and thrown hundreds of yards by the tornado. Structural debris was scattered long distances throughout the damage path, many vehicles were tossed hundreds of yards and mangled; trees were completely denuded and debarked; and numerous metal power line pylons and truss towers were bent and crumpled to the ground. First responders reported bodies strewn across devastated communities. Damages were calculated at nearly CN¥5 billion (US$760 million).

As the supercell continued past Funing, it produced another tornado of unknown intensity that destroyed several buildings and killed one person in the Sheyang area.

Response
A total of 99 people were killed by the two tornadoes, and 846 others were injured, including 152 in critical condition. China's news service, Xinhua, called the event one of the deadliest disasters to hit Jiangsu in decades, and the deadliest tornado to hit China in half a century. Communist Party General Secretary Xi Jinping and Premier Li Keqiang requested "all-out rescue efforts" to aid victims and survivors. Hundreds of residents were left trapped in rubble. The event was declared a national-level disaster. Disaster response teams were deployed from Beijing that evening, providing 1,000 tents, 2,000 beds, and floodlights.

Confirmed tornadoes

See also

 Tornadoes of 2016

Notes

References

2016 disasters in China
Disasters in Jiangsu
Tornadoes of 2016
Weather events in China
Yancheng
June 2016 events in China
Tornadoes in China